Solovetsky (masculine), Solovetskaya (feminine), or Solovetskoye (neuter) is the name of several rural localities in Russia:
Solovetsky, Arkhangelsk Oblast, a settlement in Solovetsky District of Arkhangelsk Oblast
Solovetsky, Oryol Oblast, a settlement in Nepolodsky Selsoviet of Orlovsky District of Oryol Oblast
Solovetskoye, Orlovsky District, Kirov Oblast, a selo in Podgorodny Rural Okrug of Orlovsky District of Kirov Oblast
Solovetskoye, Shabalinsky District, Kirov Oblast, a selo in Novotroitsky Rural Okrug of Shabalinsky District of Kirov Oblast
Solovetskoye, Kostroma Oblast, a selo in Solovetskoye Settlement of Oktyabrsky District of Kostroma Oblast
Solovetskoye, Omsk Oblast, a selo in Solovetsky Rural Okrug of Nizhneomsky District of Omsk Oblast